A Flumps is a British sweet made of marshmallow. The sweet is a combination of pink, yellow, white and blue marshmallow, which has the appearance of a long, twisted helix. Flumps are sold in the United Kingdom and are made by the confectioner Barratt.

They consist of glucose-fructose syrup, sugar, gelatin, cornflour, natural flavouring, and natural colours (Riboflavin, Cochineal). Flumps are sold as individual "cables" and in packets of “Mini Flumps”. Widely loved by the British public, the colourful twisted marshmallow won the "National Flump Award" on the popular British TV channel 'Channel 5' programme "The Nation's Favourite Sweets."

References

Marshmallows